The 1973–74 DDR-Oberliga season was the 26th season of the DDR-Oberliga, the top level of ice hockey in East Germany. Two teams participated in the league, and SG Dynamo Weißwasser won the championship.

Game results

Dynamo Weißwasser wins series 12:4 in points.

References

External links
East German results 1970-1990

DDR-Oberliga (ice hockey) seasons
Ober
Ger
1973 in East German sport
1974 in East German sport